Yuh Myung-woo (born January 10, 1964) is a South Korean former professional boxer who competed between 1982 and 1993. He  was a two-time WBA light-flyweight champion, having held the title between 1985 and 1993. He, together with Jung-Koo Chang, were considered as the best boxers South Korea has ever produced.

Professional career
Yuh started his pro career in 1982. Yuh's pro debut came against Byung-Boum Choi in Chinju, on March 3. Yuh won a 4 round decision. Yuh would go on to win his next six fights, all by decision in 4 rounds. Yuh's first fight beyond the minimum 4 round distance came against Hyo-Young Park in July 82, winning a 6 round decision.

In his 8th fight, Yuh faced Ki-Chang Kim in an 8 round fight in Daegu. Yuh won a unanimous decision to remain undefeated. Kim would go on to hold both the Korean National and OPBF super flyweight titles. Kim also earned a shot at the IBF super flyweight title later in his career.

Two fights later, Yuh decisioned Rae-Ki Ahn over 8 rounds, Ahn would go on to hold the Korean National Flyweight Title and earn a title shot at the WBC flyweight title.

Yuh next decisioned future Korean National light flyweight title holder Ha-Shik Lim, then scored his first stoppage win with a second round KO over Little Baguio. Baguio was a 2-time Philippine National light flyweight title holder.

Yuh's 15th pro fight proved that he was a true contender. Yuh defeated future IBF flyweight champion Bi Won Chung. Yuh defeated Chung via a 10 round decision.

Yuh Myung-woo won his first professional title in his 16th fight, capturing the vacant OPBF light flyweight title with a 3rd round Knockout of Edwin Inocencio. This fight took place on December 2, 1984 at the Munhwa Gymnasium in Seoul, South Korea. Inocencio was the reigning Philippine National light flyweight champion at the time.

Yuh would defend the OPBF title once, a 3rd round KO of Tubagus Jaya, and score another non-title victory before challenging for his first world title.

On December 8, 1985, Yuh challenged reigning WBA light flyweight champion Joey Olivo. Yuh defeated the Mexican-American champion by split decision over 15 rounds to capture his first World Title. Yuh won by scores of 146-141, 143-145 and 148-142. Yuh became the second Korean fighter to hold this title, Hwan Jin Kim had held it briefly in 1981.

Yuh's first title defense came against future WBO light flyweight champion Jose De Jesus. Yuh won a hard fought 15 round unanimous decision by scores of 144-141, 144-143 and 146-141. These two would fight again two years later with Yuh once again taking a decision.

Yuh scored 3 stoppage victories in his next four title defenses, including the only 1st round KO victory of his career, crushing Eduardo Tunon at 2:46 of the opening round.

Future IBF flyweight champion Rodolfo Blanco would fall in 8 rounds in Yuh's 6th defense which took place at Sunin University at Incheon, on September 9, 1987.

Yuh Myung-woo's 7th title defense came against career trial horse Willy Salazar. Salazar never held a World title in his career, despite holding victories over former & future champions. Salazar would hold the NABF light flyweight, the Mexican National flyweight and super flyweight, and the WBC Continental Americas super flyweight titles during his career. Salazar also was responsible for handing 2-time world champion Danny Romero his first loss of his career.

Yuh's next four title defenses came against Jose De Jesus, a split decision over 12 rounds, and stoppage victories over Putt Ohyuthanakom, Udin Baharudin and Katsumi Komiyama.

Yuh's 12th title defense came against Mario Alberto De Marco in June 1989. Yuh won a unanimous decision over 12 rounds, by scores of 118-113, 118-115 and 119-114. Yuh feasted on Japanese challengers in his next two defenses, scoring an 11th round stoppage of Kenbun Taiho and a 7th round KO over future OPBF flyweight champion Hisashi Tokushima.

On April 29, 1990, Yuh faced the toughest fighter of his career in his 15th title defense. Yuh defeated former WBA minimum weight champion Leo Gamez by split decision over 12 rounds. The scores were 116-113, 117-115 and 114-116. Gamez had entered this fight an undefeated fighter, with a record of 20-0. None of the judges were from South Korea.

Due to the closeness of their first outing, Yuh and Gamez faced each other in a rematch held on November 11, 1990. This time, Yuh won by unanimous decision, 116-112, 117-111 and 118-112. Gamez would go on to become one of 9 men in boxing history to have held world titles in four different weight classes. Gamez would go on to capture the WBA light flyweight title at a later date, and to win both the WBA flyweight & the WBA super flyweight titles.

Yuh Myung-woo's record 17th title defense came against Kajkong Danphuthai on April 28, 1991. Yuh knocked out Danphuthai in the 10th round.

On December 12, 1991, Yuh stepped into the ring as a heavy favorite to make his 18th successful defense against former WBC strawweight champion Hiroki Ioka. This fight was to be the first fight of Yuh's career held outside his native South Korea. At Prefectural Gymnasium in Osaka, Japan, Ioka scored a 12 round split decision victory over Yuh by scores of 113-115, 117-112 and 115-113 to capture the WBA light flyweight title. All three judges for this fight, Harold Lederman, Oscar Perez and Phil Newman were from the United States.

After losing his title, Yuh would spend almost a year outside of the ring awaiting a rematch. During this time Ioka would make 2 successful title defenses.

On November 18, 1992, Yuh returned to Japan to the same arena where he had lost his title, to reclaim it with a 12 round majority decision over Hiroki Ioka. Yuh reclaimed his WBA light flyweight title by scores of 114-114, 117-112 and 119-111. Once again, all three judges were from neutral countries.

Yuh would make one more appearance in the ring before retiring as the most storied 108-pound fighter ever. On July 25, 1993, Yuh decisioned Yuichi Hosono over 12 rounds to retain his title, the only title defense of his second reign.

Retirement
With family on hand, Yuh announced his retirement after this fight, leaving his career behind with a record of 38-1 (14 KO's).

Legacy
Yuh made 17 successful title defenses during his first reign, the record for the light-flyweight division. Yuh's record surpassed the previous record of 15 successful title defenses in a continuous reign set by former 
WBC light-flyweight champion Jung Koo Chang. Yuh is one of only 5 fighters to have successfully defended their light-flyweight title at least 10 times in one reign. Yoko Gushiken defended the WBA light-flyweight title 13 times, Luis Estaba defended the light-flyweight title 11 times and Saman Sorjaturong made 10 successful title defenses of his light-flyweight title. Yuh was inducted to International Boxing Hall of Fame in 2013.

Professional boxing record

See also
List of world light-flyweight boxing champions
List of Korean boxers

References

External links

 

1964 births
Living people
South Korean male boxers
Sportspeople from Seoul
Light-flyweight boxers
World light-flyweight boxing champions
World Boxing Association champions
International Boxing Hall of Fame inductees